Laurence Neville Harding-Smith (11 December 1929 – 4 July 2021) was an Australian fencer. He competed in the individual épée event at the 1956 Summer Olympics.

References

External links
 

1929 births
2021 deaths
Australian male fencers
Olympic fencers of Australia
Fencers at the 1956 Summer Olympics
Commonwealth Games medallists in fencing
Commonwealth Games bronze medallists for Australia
Fencers at the 1954 British Empire and Commonwealth Games
20th-century Australian people
Medallists at the 1954 British Empire and Commonwealth Games